Michele O'Brien (born 28 June 1980) is a soccer coach and former striker, who played for the W-League club Chicago Red Eleven. Since making her debut for the Republic of Ireland women's national football team in 2003, she gained over 50 caps.

College career
O'Brien played varsity soccer during four seasons at Florida International University. She remains the program's all–time record goalscorer.

Club career
In 2000 O'Brien started playing for the Long Island Lady Riders. She remained with them until 2007, with a spell at Arsenal in 2003. During her time at the English club, O'Brien played in the Women's Premier League and the semi–final of the UEFA Women's Cup.

In 2007 O'Brien joined the Damallsvenskan club QBIK. She then spent time back in England with Watford Ladies, before joining Jersey Sky Blue for the 2008 W-League season. The following season O'Brien moved to Chicago Red Eleven and scored four goals in 11 games in 2009. In 2010, she scored one goal in three games for the Red Eleven.

International career
O'Brien debuted for the Republic of Ireland in 2003 and went on to accumulate more than 50 caps. In 2005 O'Brien was named the FAI Player of the Year.

Coaching career
O'Brien coached soccer at New York University (2004–2005) and Columbia University (2005–2007). She was named assistant soccer coach at DePaul University in February 2009. She was promoted to head coach at DePaul in June 2021.

Personal life
Born with a congenital heart defect, in 1995 O'Brien suffered a heart attack after a High School P.E. lesson and required open heart surgery. She refused to quit soccer, reportedly telling her concerned parent: "Mom, I might as well die doing something I like".

References

External links
Michele O'Brien at UEFA
Michele O'Brien at FAI
Michele O'Brien at Chicago Red Eleven

Republic of Ireland women's association footballers
Republic of Ireland women's international footballers
FA Women's National League players
1980 births
Living people
Arsenal W.F.C. players
Soccer players from New York (state)
People from Plainview, New York
Expatriate women's footballers in England
Expatriate women's footballers in Sweden
QBIK players
Damallsvenskan players
Watford F.C. Women players
USL W-League (1995–2015) players
American women's soccer players
FIU Panthers women's soccer players
Women's association football forwards
Long Island Rough Riders (USL W League) players